Wheelchair fencing at the 2010 Asian Para Games was held in Guangda Gymnasium, Guangzhou, China from December 14 to 16, 2010.

Medal summary

Medal table
Retrieved from Asian Para Games 2010 Official Website.

Medalists

Men

Women

Results

Men

Individual Epée Category A

Individual Epée Category B

Individual Foil Category A

Individual Foil Category B

Individual Sabre Category A

Individual Sabre Category B

Team Foil

Women

Individual Epée Category A

Individual Epée Category B

Individual Foil Category A

Individual Foil Category B

Team Foil

References

2010 Asian Para Games events
2010 Asian Para-Games
Asian Para Games
International fencing competitions hosted by China